Schappert is a surname of German origin meaning shepherd, which is related to the English surname Shepherd.

Notable people with the surname include:
 Ashley Schappert (born 1985), athlete, entrepreneur, and film producer
 Jason Schappert (born 1988), aviator
 John Schappert (baseball) (died 1917), baseball pitcher
 Nicole Schappert (born 1986), maiden name of distance runner Nicole Tully
 Terry Schappert (born 1962), soldier and television presenter

References

German-language surnames